Edward George McGill Alexander  (born 31 March 1947) is a former South African Army officer.

Alexander has participated in airborne exercises and conferences with the British Army, and has jumped with and been awarded parachute wings by the Chilean, British and ROC Armies.  He has written many articles on military topics, some of which have been published internationally, including one by the US Army.  He has also authored or co-authored three books. A frequent speaker at symposia and conferences on military matters, General Alexander delivered the 2006 Turner Lecture at the SA Military Academy and in the same year delivered a paper at a Military History Conference on Small Wars and Insurgencies in Canberra, Australia.  Besides the  degree from the University of Stellenbosch, he holds an Honours BA, an MA (cum laude) and a PhD in history from the University of South Africa.

Early life
General McGill Alexander was born on 31 March 1947 in Boksburg.  He grew up on farms in the Free State and Rhodesia, went to boarding school and matriculated from the Potchefstroom High School for Boys in 1965.

Early Military Career
He trained guide-dogs for the blind for 18 months before volunteering for military service and underwent basic training with 1 SA Infantry Battalion in Oudtshoorn in 1967.  He then volunteered for the paratroops and was awarded his parachute wings at Tempe, Bloemfontein in February 1968.  He served as a rifleman in B-Company, 1 Parachute Battalion and after completing his training he continued his service in the Citizen Force with 1 Parachute Battalion.  He was promoted to corporal and served as a section leader.

Later, he was recommended for officer's training and was commissioned as a 2nd lieutenant in the newly established 2 Parachute Battalion in July 1972.  Having completed the platoon commanders and company  courses at the Infantry School, Oudtshoorn, he served in those capacities in 2 Parachute Battalion. During this time,  in his civilian capacity, he ran outdoor pursuit courses for the South African Exploration Society.  In 1975 he joined the Permanent Force and was appointed as an Officer Instructor at 1 Parachute Battalion with the rank of lieutenant, again serving as a company second-in-command.

Sent to the Military Academy in Saldanha, Lt Alexander graduated with a  degree from Stellenbosch University in 1978, serving operationally with 2 Parachute Battalion as a platoon commander in Namibia during the university recess.  He returned to 1 Parachute Battalion, where he served for several years in various posts, including as adjutant, company commander (principally of his old company, B-Company), SO2 Training and Training Wing 2IC.  During this time he was promoted to captain in 1979 and to major in 1982.

Operations
He participated in operations in Angola and Namibia and in 1980 he was awarded the Military Merit Medal for his role in leading a successful helicopter assault on Chitado in Angola.

He participated in operations with 61 Mechanised Infantry Battalion Group in Angola and Namibia and also briefly commanded Battle Group Phantom, a temporarily constituted grouping, during counter-insurgency operations in Namibia.

Military Courses
Between his operational and training duties he qualified as a parachute dispatcher, a parachute instructor and a tactical free-fall parachutist.

Foreign training included completing a pathfinder course with the Israeli paratroops in 1980, and a Special Forces course with the Chilean Army Commandos in 1981.  For the latter he had to first learn Spanish.

He underwent the requisite courses at the Infantry School in Oudtshoorn, including counter-insurgency, battalion mortars, battalion anti-tank and company as well as battalion battle-handling. In addition, he attended the Combat Team and Battle Group courses at the Army Battle School (South Africa) in Lohatlha, which included Intelligence Courses at the Intelligence School in Kimberley, an Advanced Counter-insurgency Course at the Danie Theron Combat School in Kimberley and Personnel and Logistics Courses in Pretoria.  During exercises at Lohatlha he commanded a mechanised battle group.

Further training and posts
In 1983, Maj Alexander was selected to undergo Senior Command and Staff Training at the Spanish Army Staff College in Madrid, and spent two years there with his family, studying  doctrine and procedures.  He graduated from the college as Diplomado de Estado Mayor. On his return he was promoted to commandant (lieutenant-colonel) and appointed as a member of the Directing Staff at the SA Army College.  In 1986 he became the SO1 Operations at 44 Parachute Brigade, in which capacity he initiated battalion group-sized airborne exercises and was awarded the Southern Cross Medal for his efforts and for developing an airborne anti-tank system. He took over as acting Brigade Commander in 1988, and was formally appointed as Officer Commanding 44 Parachute Brigade in 1989 with the rank of colonel.

Colonel Alexander was tasked to cross-train the Parachute Brigade for amphibious operations and participated in four amphibious exercises, three of them as the Commander Army Landing Forces.  He also planned and conducted seven parachute and helicopter-borne exercises of battalion group to brigade size.  He was ordered to carry out the last airborne operation of the war in Namibia when a parachute battalion group had to be air-landed in April 1989 in the Kaokoveld of Namibia. Colonel Alexander also initiated the use of paratroops in an airborne role during urban counter-insurgency operations in South Africa, participating with 3 Parachute Battalion in a drop into Soweto in 1991.

In 1992 Col Alexander was instructed to move the brigade from Murrayhill outside Pretoria to Tempe in Bloemfontein and was then appointed as Officer Commanding Group 18 HQ in Johannesburg.  Here he was responsible for keeping the peace between opposing political factions in the township of Alexandra, where what amounted to a civil war was raging between the ANC and the IFP.  His old company, B-Company, 1 Parachute Battalion, was one of the sub-units placed under his operational command to accomplish this task.

From 1993 to 1995 Col Alexander was the Chief Instructor Staff Duties at the SA Army College, where he ran the Army's Senior Command and Staff Duties Courses. During this course (the highest level course presented by the SANDF) he was awarded the trophy for the best research paper on strategy. That same year, he and his wife attended a course on International Diplomacy at the Intelligence College.

From 1996 to 1997 Col Alexander served as the last SA Armed Forces Attaché in Taiwan.  He and his family were taken hostage during their last few weeks in this post, and both Col Alexander and his eldest daughter were shot and wounded during a failed rescue attempt.

Col Alexander was next posted to Far North Command in Pietersburg (now Polokwane) as the SSO Operations in 1998. Here he was responsible for planning and coordinating control of South Africa's northern borders, preventing the influx of illegal immigrants and undesirable elements. Also in 1998, he was detached and appointed as the Commander of the Richmond Task Group in KwaZulu-Natal, where he had to establish and maintain the peace between the ANC and the UDM during violent clashes between the two groups in the Midlands of that province.

In April 1999, he was promoted to brigadier-general (his last promotion) and appointed Chief of Staff of the new Regional Joint Task Force South in the Eastern Cape.  During this term General Alexander and several other general officers survived a helicopter crash in the Drakensberg Mountains.

In 2001 he was appointed by the Chief of Joint Operations to report to him on the operational readiness of airborne forces in the SANDF. In 2002 he took over as General Officer Commanding  South, but in 2003 General Alexander was tasked to close down all the s.

In 2004 he became the SANDF's Director of Joint Doctrine Development, but was replaced in terms of the Affirmative Action policy in 2005.  From then until his retirement two years later General Alexander did not have a post, but ran Project CLEOPATRA, which was concerned with the resuscitation of the SANDF's airborne capability.  He also chaired the committee compiling the SANDF's Peace Support Operations Doctrine and was sent to Sudan to investigate a  deployment.

Retirement
On his retirement from the Regular Force in 2007, General Alexander joined the Reserve Force and was thereafter frequently called up to continue chairing Project CLEOPATRA, to evaluate airborne exercises, to commentate at airborne demonstrations and to chair the writing of the SADF's Airborne Operations Doctrine. After his retirement from the Reserve Force in 2014, General Alexander served for 18 months on the Reserve Force Council, a statutory body meant to advise the Minister of Defence on Reserve Force matters. For three years he did contract work with Chute Systems, a South African company, training officers of the Special Forces of the Namibian Defence Force (NDF) and coordinating the writing of a doctrine on Airborne Operations for the NDF. He chairs the Management Board of Hannah's Arms, a Port Elizabeth Non-Profit Organisation that cares for abandoned, abused and neglected babies.

After retiring from the SANDF, General Alexander and his wife Anne returned to Port Elizabeth where he commenced working on his PhD degree in history. This was awarded by the University of South Africa (Unisa) in 2016 for his research thesis titled: "The Airborne Concept in the South African Military 1960-2000 - Strategy versus Tactics in Small Wars".

Personal life
He has been married to Anne since 1972 and they have three daughters, four granddaughters and three grandsons. General Alexander's interests include writing, military history (he is an active member of the South African Military History Society, Eastern Cape Branch), photography, camping and 4x4 off-road excursions, hiking, travelling and acting as Chief Range Officer for the annual South African Bisley Target Rifle Championships. He has twice been Chief Range Officer for the World Championships.  He is also a keen Scottish Country Dancing enthusiast when he gets the opportunity and he is involved in maintaining a contact network with his old school friends from Potchefstroom.  He is a committed Christian and is active in his local church. He and his wife are directly involved in the care of abandoned, abused and neglected babies.

Awards
Brig Gen Alexander has received the following awards during his career:

Medals and decorations
 
 
 
 
 
 
 
 
 
 
 
 Spanish Army Medical Service Medal
 SADC Peace Support Operations Medal, 2009

Proficiency Awards
 
 
 
 Chilean Army Commando Ribbon
 Spanish Army DEM badge

Publications

References

South African Army generals
South African military officers
Living people
1947 births
People from Boksburg
Military attachés